This is a list of universities in Zimbabwe. 

Africa University (AU)
Arrupe Jesuit University(AJU)
Bindura University of Science Education (BUSE)
Catholic University in Zimbabwe (CUZ)
Chinhoyi University of Technology (CUT)
Great Zimbabwe University, formerly Masvingo State University
Gwanda State University (GSU)
Harare Institute of Technology (HIT)
Lupane State University (LSU)
Manicaland State University of Applied Sciences (MSUAS)
Marondera University of Agricultural Science & Technology (MUAST)
Midlands State University (MSU)
National University of Science and Technology, Zimbabwe (NUST)
Reformed Church University
Solusi University
Sourthen Africa Methodist University (SAMU)
University of Zimbabwe (UZ)
Women's University in Africa (WUA)
Zimbabwe Ezekiel Guti University (ZEGU)
Zimbabwe Open University (ZOU)

See also
Education in Zimbabwe
Schools in Zimbabwe
 Levels of education: higher education, foundation degree and further education

References

External links
 Ministry of Higher and Tertiary Education

 
Universities
Zimbabwe
Zimbabwe